Dinocaridida is a proposed fossil taxon of basal arthropods that flourished in the Cambrian period with occasional Ordovician and Devonian records. Characterized by a pair of frontal appendages and series of body flaps, the name of Dinocaridids comes from Greek, "deinos" and "caris" ("terrible crab"), referring to the suggested role of some of these members as the largest marine predators of their time. Dinocaridids are occasionally referred to as the 'AOPK group' by some literatures, as the group compose of Radiodonta (Anomalocaris and relatives), Opabiniidae (Opabinia and relatives), Pambdelurion and Kerygmachela. It is most likely paraphyletic, with Kerygmachela and Pambdelurion more basal than the clade compose of Opabiniidae, Radiodonta and other arthropods.

Anatomy

Dinocaridids were bilaterally symmetrical, with a mostly non-mineralized cuticle and a body divided into two major groupings of tagmata (body-sections): head and trunk. The head apparently unsegmented and had a pair of specialized frontal appendages just in front of the mouth and eyes. The frontal appendages are either lobopodous (soft as in gilled lobopodians) or arthropodized (hardened and segmented as in Radiodonta) and usually paired, but highly fused into a nozzle-like structure in Opabiniidae. Based on their preocular position and putative protocerebral origin, the frontal appendages are generally though to be homologous to the labrum of euarthropods and primary antennae of onychophoran, while subsequent evidence also suggest a deutocerebral origin (homologous to the jaws of onychophora and great appendages/antennae/chelicerae of euarthropods). The trunk possessed multiple segments, each with its own gill branch and swimming flaps (lobes). It is thought that these flaps moved in an up-and-down motion, in order to propel the animal forward in a fashion similar to the cuttlefish. In gilled lobopodian genera, the trunk may have borne a lobopodous limb (lobopod) underneath each of the flaps. The midgut of dinocaridids had paired digestive glands similar to those of siberiid lobopodians and cambrian euarthropods. The dinocaridid brain is relatively simple than those of an euarthropod (3-segmented), it is thought to be comprised either 1 (only protocerebrum) or 2 cerebral ganglions (protocerebrum and deutocerebrum).

Classification 

Although some authors may rather suggest different taxonomic affinities (e.g. as cycloneuralian relatives), most of the phylogenetic studies suggest that dinocaridids are stem group arthropods. Under this scenario, Dinocaridida is a paraphyletic grade in correspond to the arthropod crown group (Euarthropoda or Deuteropoda) and also suggest a lobopodian origin of the arthropod lineage. In general, the gilled lobopodian genera Pambdelurion and Kerygmachela which have lobopodian traits (e.g. lobopodous appendage, annulation) occupied the basal position; while Opabiniidae and Radiodonta are more derived and closely related to the arthropod crown group, with the latter even having significant arthropod affinities such as arthropodization and head sclerites.

In the original description, Dinocaridida was composed of only Opabiniidae and Radiodonta. With the exclusion of questionable taxa (e.g. the putative opabiniid Myoscolex), the former were known only by Opabinia, while all radiodont species were grouped under a single family: Anomalocarididae (hence the previous common name 'Anomalocaridids'). In later studies, the gilled lobopodians Pambdelurion and Kerygmachela were also regarded to be dinocaridids, a new opabiniid genus Utaurora was described, other strange dinocaridids like Parvibellus and Mieridduryn, and many radiodonts were reassigned to other new families (Amplectobeluidae, Tamisiocarididae and Hurdiidae).

Distribution 
The group was geographically widespread, and has been reported from Cambrian strata in Canada, United States, Greenland, China, Australia and Russia, as well as the Ordovician of Morocco and Devonian of Germany.

Notes

References

 
Cambrian arthropods
Devonian arthropods
Ordovician arthropods
Cambrian first appearances
Early Devonian extinctions
Burgess Shale fossils
Maotianshan shales fossils
Sirius Passet fossils
Paleozoic animals of Asia
Paleozoic animals of North America
Prehistoric China
Paleozoic Greenland
Arthropod classes
Prehistoric protostome classes
Paraphyletic groups